The Palazzo Busini Bardi is a palace located on Via dei Benci #5 in central Florence, Tuscany, Italy. It is in front of the Museo Horne.

Design of the palace (circa 1430) was attributed to the architect Filippo Brunelleschi by the sixteenth century art biographer Giorgio Vasari.

References

Palaces in Florence
Renaissance architecture in Florence